Stanislav Soslanovich Tskhovrebov (born 27 February 1969) is a Russian professional football coach and a former player.

Tskhovrebov spent one seasons in the Slovak top division with FC Nitra, appearing in eight league matches.

Honours
 Russian Premier League runner-up: 1992.
 Czechoslovak First League bronze: 1993.

References

External links

1969 births
Living people
Soviet footballers
Russian footballers
Russian Premier League players
Russian expatriate footballers
Expatriate footballers in Slovakia
FC Spartak Vladikavkaz players
ŠK Slovan Bratislava players
FC Nitra players
FC SKA Rostov-on-Don players
Russian football managers
FC Spartak Vladikavkaz managers
Association football forwards
Sportspeople from Vladikavkaz